Kurucaşile District is a district of the Bartın Province of Turkey. Its seat is the town of Kurucaşile. Its area is 152 km2, and its population is 6,424 (2021).

Composition
There is one municipality in Kurucaşile District:
 Kurucaşile

There are 28 villages in Kurucaşile District:

 Alapınar
 Aydoğmuş
 Başköy
 Çayaltı
 Curunlu
 Danişment
 Demirci
 Dizlermezeci
 Elvanlar
 Hacıköy
 Hisarköy
 İlyasgeçidi
 Kaleköy
 Kanatlı
 Kapısuyu
 Karaman
 Kavaklı
 Kirlikmüslimhoca
 Kömeç
 Meydan
 Ömerler
 Ovatekkeönü
 Paşalılar
 Sarıderesi
 Şeyhler
 Uğurlu
 Yeniköy
 Ziyaretköy

References

Districts of Bartın Province